Shakargarh , the capital of Shakargarh Tehsil, is a city in the north-eastern part of Narowal District in the Punjab province of Pakistan. It borders Jammu, India to the north and Sialkot to the west Its literacy rate is more than 85% which is the highest literacy rate tehsil-wise. The city is located at 32°16'0N 75°10'0E and is situated at the west bank of the Ravi River. The Tehsil is administratively subdivided into 35 Union Councils, three of which form the Tehsil capital Shakargarh.

Demographics
The total area of Shakargarh is approximately 1,272 square kilometres. According to the 1998 census, Narowal District's population was 1,256,097 of which only 12.11% were urban.  The Tehsil's population is 80 percent Gujjar and 20 percent others.

References

External links 
  Shakargarh Official Facebook Page : https://www.facebook.com/Shakargarh.net.official
  Shakargarh Official Website : https://shakargarh.net
 

Populated places in Narowal District
Cities in Punjab (Pakistan)

ur:شکرگڑھ